"Dead Man's Chest" is a 19th-century fictional sea shanty.

Dead Man's Chest may also refer to:
Dead Chest Island, British Virgin Islands, in the British Virgin Islands
Caja de Muertos, or Dead Man's Chest Island in Puerto Rico
"Dead Man's Chest", a song by Parkway Drive from Horizons
Pirates of the Caribbean: Dead Man's Chest, a 2006 film
Pirates of the Caribbean: Dead Man's Chest (soundtrack), soundtrack for the film
Pirates of the Caribbean: Dead Man's Chest (video game), an action-adventure game based on the film

See also
Dead Man (disambiguation)